Carrara Australian Football Club (nicknamed The Saints) is a Carrara based club competing in the SEQAFL Div 3 Australian rules football competition & also caters for teams in junior & youth divisions AFLQGC juniors .

Origins
Carrara Saints AFL Club is a junior and senior Aussie Rules club located on Nielsons Road Carrara, only a stone's throw from The Gold Coast Suns home ground, Metricon Stadium.

The Saints have teams from ages 5/6 to 16 years for boys & girls as well as men's senior/reserve teams and also Masters teams

The junior club was established in 1998 with various teams taking out the premiership for their age group in their division

The senior club was established in 2012 and won their first premiership in 2018.

Carrara Saints Masters established 2016.

Division Four (2012) 
After a promising season of blooding youngsters to the rigours of senior football, the club finish last with 4 wins.

Division Three (2013) 
The club was promoted to Division 3 of the AFLSEQ. The team finished the year with  wins.

QAFA (A) (2014)
Another competition restructure the club will compete in the Queensland Amateurs A grade.

References

External links
 Official website

Australian rules football clubs established in 2012
Queensland State Football League clubs
2012 establishments in Australia
Carrara, Queensland
Australian rules football teams on the Gold Coast, Queensland